Spruce Grove School is a historic one-room school located in Newlin Township, Chester County, Pennsylvania. The school was built in 1839, and is a one-story, 24-feet square stone structure with a gable roof. It features a corbeled stone cornice. In 1924, Spruce Grove School was converted to a private residence.  Also on the property is a stone abutment for a suspension bridge that once crossed the adjacent West Branch of the Brandywine River.

It was added to the National Register of Historic Places in 1985.

References

One-room schoolhouses in Pennsylvania
School buildings on the National Register of Historic Places in Pennsylvania
School buildings completed in 1839
Schools in Chester County, Pennsylvania
National Register of Historic Places in Chester County, Pennsylvania